Spring Point is a point forming the south side of the entrance to Brialmont Cove, on the west coast of Graham Land in Antarctica. Discovered in 1898 by the Belgian Antarctic Expedition under Gerlache. He named it for Professor Walthère-Victor Spring chemist of the Université de Liège, a member of the Académie Royale de Belgique and of the Commission de la Belgica.

References

Danco Coast